"Se ilden lyse" (in English: "Fire in Your Heart") is a single by Norwegian singer Sissel Kyrkjebø, released as the official song of the 1994 Winter Olympics in Lillehammer, Norway. It was a huge hit, peaking at number-one for three weeks on the Norwegian singles chart. In English, it is also sung as a duet with Spanish tenor Plácido Domingo. Both versions are written by Jan Vincents Johannessen and composed/produced by Svein Gundersen. It features Oslo Gospel Choir and fiddle by Annbjørg Lien. The songs were also included on Kyrkjebø's 1994 number-one album release, Innerst i sjelen (in English: Deep Within My Soul).

Background
The duet between Sissel and Plácido Domingo, Fire in Your Heart, was recorded in a canteen in Lillehammer before the opening of the 1994 Winter Olympics. Because of the tight schedules of both Plácido Domingo and Sissel, they had only a few hours to record this English version of the Olympics anthem before the opening ceremony. When they recorded the song in the canteen, coffee cups and food could still be seen on the tables!

Chart performance
In Norway, "Se ilden lyse" reached number-one on VG-lista Top 20 and stayed on the list for nine weeks, with three weeks as number-one. In Denmark, it peaked at number 17. The international single-release, "Fire in Your Heart" peaked at number nine on Sverigetopplistan in Sweden, with a total of six weeks within the chart. The duet-version with Plácido Domingo peaked at number twenty in Switzerland and number 26 in Germany.

Track listing
 CD maxi, Norway (1994)
"Se ilden lyse" – 4:22
"Fire In Your Heart" – 4:22 

 CD single, Germany (1994)
"Fire In Your Heart" (Duet with Plácido Domingo) – 4:22
"The Gift of Love" – 4:07
"Se ilden lyse" – 4:22

 CD single, Germany (1994)
"Fire In Your Heart" – 4:22
"The Gift of Love" – 4:07
"Se ilden lyse" – 4:22

 CD single mini, Japan (1994)
"Fire In Your Heart" – 4:21
"Se ilden lyse" – 4:21
"Here, There and Everywhere" – 2:38

Charts

Se ilden lyse

Weekly charts

Fire in Your Heart

Weekly charts

Year-end charts

Fire in Your Heart (duet with Plácido Domingo)

Weekly charts

References

1994 singles
1994 songs
1994 Winter Olympics
Male–female vocal duets
English-language Norwegian songs
Norwegian songs
Number-one singles in Norway
Plácido Domingo songs
Sissel Kyrkjebø songs
Universal Records singles